The canton of Mandelieu-la-Napoule is an administrative division of the Alpes-Maritimes department, southeastern France. It was created at the French canton reorganisation which came into effect in March 2015. Its seat is in Mandelieu-la-Napoule.

It consists of the following communes:
Auribeau-sur-Siagne 
Mandelieu-la-Napoule
Pégomas
La Roquette-sur-Siagne
Théoule-sur-Mer

References

Cantons of Alpes-Maritimes